Shiri Freda Appleby (born December 7, 1978) is an American actress and television director. She is best known for her leading roles as Liz Parker in the WB/UPN science fiction drama series Roswell (1999–2002) and Rachel Goldberg in the Lifetime/Hulu drama series Unreal (2015–2018).

Her major film credits include A Time for Dancing (2000), Swimfan (2002), Havoc (2005), Charlie Wilson's War (2007), and The Devil's Candy (2015).

Appleby also starred as intern Daria Wade in the final season of the NBC medical drama series ER (2008–2009). She later starred as Cate Cassidy in The CW drama series Life Unexpected (2010–2011) and as Lucy Lambert in the web comedy series Dating Rules from My Future Self (2012). Appleby also had recurring roles on the NBC drama series Chicago Fire (2012–2013) and the HBO comedy-drama series Girls (2013–2014).

Early life and education
Appleby's Israeli-born mother is of Moroccan Jewish descent, and her father is American and of Ashkenazi Jewish descent. Appleby's mother was an actress in Israel. She was raised in Calabasas in Los Angeles County and kept kosher in her home growing up. She attended Hebrew school, and had a Bat Mitzvah.

Appleby graduated from Calabasas High School in 1997. She attended University of Southern California from 1998 to 1999, where she studied English. After two years she got the starring role in Roswell and was working steadily, but while shooting Life Unexpected in 2010, Appleby started to work towards a psychology degree from the online University of Phoenix. It took her 14 months, while also working, to complete the degree in 2012.

Career
Appleby began her acting career at the age of four, starting with advertisements for various products such as Cheerios and M&M's. She started acting and taking acting classes because her parents were concerned that she was so shy and introverted. Her first advertisement was for Raisin Bran, but it was never aired. She made guest appearances on many television programs, most notably thirtysomething (1987), Doogie Howser, M.D. (1989), ER (1994), Baywatch (1989), Xena: Warrior Princess (1995), 7th Heaven (1997), Beverly Hills, 90210 (1990), before landing her break-out role in the series Roswell (1999–2002), where she tried out for the roles of Isabel and Maria before landing the leading role of Liz Parker.

Appleby has been featured in a number of music videos, such as Bon Jovi's video for "It's My Life" with Will Estes, and the 2004 video for the song "I Don't Want to Be" by Gavin DeGraw, opposite Scott Mechlowicz. She also appeared in Sense Field's music video for "Save Yourself," which is part of the Roswell soundtrack and featured in the first season DVD box set.

In 2006, she had a recurring role on the short-lived ABC drama Six Degrees as Anya, a young assistant in a relationship with a much older photographer. Later that year, she played Hildy Young in the new USA Network series To Love and Die, that began airing in late December 2008. She also participated in a short film called Carjacking directed by Dan Passman and co-starring Geoff Stults.

In 2007, she appeared in the movie What Love Is alongside Cuba Gooding Jr., Matthew Lillard, and Anne Heche. She also participated in another short film Love Like Wind from Shaolin Film Productions. At the end of the year, she appeared as Charlie Wilson's press secretary in the film Charlie Wilson's War, which stars Tom Hanks and Julia Roberts. In 2008, Appleby had a recurring role on the 15th and final season of ER (her second time on the show), playing an intern named Daria Wade.

In 2010, Appleby starred in The CW network drama Life Unexpected as Cate Cassidy, a radio talk show host whose daughter whom she gave up for adoption becomes a part of her life. The show was canceled after two seasons.

In 2012, Appleby starred as the main character of Dating Rules from My Future Self, which she also produced.

In 2013, she had a role in the Lena Dunham HBO series, Girls, which was controversial. She said the role allowed her to break out of a career where she was often typecast as being sweet. Appleby said that she got the role because she was shadowing director Jesse Peretz (as she is interested in directing), and talked with Girls producer Jenni Konner, with whom she was friendly. Konner asked her if she would be interested in the part.

In 2013, she was cast in the leading role in the Lifetime drama/dark comedy series Unreal, a show about the inner workings of a reality show (a show within a show), which premiered on June 1, 2015, and was produced by former The Bachelor producer, Sarah Gertrude Shapiro and writer Marti Noxon. To research her role as a reality show dating show producer, Appleby said that she spent time with a producer to quiz them about the work. She said that one of the appeals of the show was that the central focus was not about her character being in a romantic relationship. The show garnered strong reviews and had been picked up for four seasons. In 2016, Appleby directed her first episode of Unreal, titled "Casualty". She went on to direct multiple episodes of the series. In July 2018, the series ended after four seasons.

In 2017, Appleby starred in Janicza Bravo's first full length feature, Lemon, which debuted at Sundance Film Festival.

In 2021, Appleby had a cameo role in the last scene of Season 3 Episode 13 of Roswell, New Mexico.

Personal life

In July 2012, Appleby got engaged to her boyfriend of two years, chef and restaurateur Jon Shook, during a trip to Ventotene, Italy. Shook is the co-owner with Vinny Dotolo of the Los Angeles restaurants Animal, Son of a Gun, Trois Mec, and Jon & Vinny's. Shook said that he met Appleby through his business partner Dotolo's wife, who was friends with Appleby. In December 2012, the couple announced that they were expecting their first child in early 2013. Appleby gave birth to a girl in March 2013. Shook and Appleby have since married. Their second child, a son, was born in December 2015.

In Hebrew, the word shiri means either "my song" or "my poem" or simply "sing" (second person female imperative). Appleby said her parents said that when she was born, she was like the song in their hearts.

She has a scar above her left eyebrow that she got when a neighbor's dog bit her when she was young. To get over her fear of dogs, she went on the show Emergency Vets, accompanying staff veterinarian Dr. Kevin Fitzgerald (she also overcame another phobia in the same episode by holding a live snake, one of Fitzgerald's patients) and shortly after adopted a tabby cat, which she named Abby.

Filmography

Film

Television

Web

Director

Accolades

References

External links
 
 
 

1978 births
Living people
Actresses from Los Angeles
People from Calabasas, California
American Mizrahi Jews
American Ashkenazi Jews
American child actresses
American film actresses
American people of Israeli descent
American people of Moroccan-Jewish descent
American Sephardic Jews
American television actresses
Jewish American actresses
University of Phoenix alumni
20th-century American actresses
21st-century American actresses
20th-century American Sephardic Jews
21st-century American Sephardic Jews